This is a list of people associated with John Carroll University in University Heights, Ohio. This includes faculty, alumni, staff, and former university Presidents. John Carroll University is a private, co-educational Jesuit university in the greater Cleveland, Ohio area in the United States. The university was founded as Saint Ignatius College by the Society of Jesus. A member of the Association of Jesuit Colleges and Universities, John Carroll was founded in 1886. The university enrolls approximately 4,000 students per year.

Alumni

Media
Paisley Dodds – AP London Bureau chief
Tim Russert – former NBC News Washington Bureau Chief; host and moderator of Meet the Press; the university's Department of Communication and Theatre Arts was renamed in his honor May 2009

Government
Sara Bloomfield – director, United States Holocaust Memorial Museum (M.A. from John Carroll University)
Donald Burkart - State Representative, Wyoming Legislature
Rick Carfagna – State Representative and Assistant Majority Floor Leader, Ohio House of Representatives
Anthony J. Celebrezze – Federal Court of Appeals judge, US Sec. of Health, Education and Welfare, Mayor of Cleveland
Frank D. Celebrezze I – politician; brother of Anthony Celebrezze
Anne C. Conway – judge of the United States District Court for the Middle District of Florida
John Cranley –  Mayor of Cincinnati, Ohio
Timothy J. DeGeeter – state representative, Ohio Legislature and mayor of Parma, Ohio   
Mike Hope – state representative, Washington State Legislature
Tom McNamara –  Mayor of Rockford, Illinois
Donald J. McConnell –  former United States ambassador to Eritrea
Tom Murphy – former mayor of Pittsburgh, Pennsylvania
Mary Rose Oakar – former Congresswoman (M.A. from John Carroll University)
Jon Powers – politician, U.S. Army captain, and founder of War Kids Relief
Paweł Wojciechowski – Polish economist; former Polish minister of finance

Military

Carter Ham –  former general, United States Army, serving as commanding general, U.S. Army, Europe
John D. Lavelle –  General, United States Air Force; 4 stars restored by President Barack Obama, 2010
Carl E. Walz – United States colonel (Ret.) and astronaut (M.S. from John Carroll University)

Business
James C. Boland – former vice chairman of Ernst & Young; board member of the Goodyear Tire and Rubber Company, Sherwin-Williams, Invacare and SITE Centers
Charles Dolan – founder of Cablevision and HBO
Timothy Donahue – former executive chairman of Sprint Nextel
Jack Kahl, founder of Manco and the Duck Tape brand
John Rooney – former president and CEO of U.S. Cellular
Richard J. Kramer – Chairman of Goodyear Tire and Rubber Company

Sports
Graham Armstrong – American football player
Tom Arth – professional football player, Indianapolis Colts and Green Bay Packers, former head coach for University of Akron
David Caldwell – former general manager, Jacksonville Jaguars
Nick Caley – assistant coach, NFL
Nick Caserio – general manager, Houston Texans
Enrique Ecker – former NFL player
London Fletcher –  professional football player, St. Louis Rams, Buffalo Bills, and Washington Redskins
Peter Goodwin – former dean, World's Strongest Man
Wade Manning – former NFL player
Josh McDaniels –  Head Coach of the Las Vegas Raiders, offensive coordinator of the New England Patriots, former head coach for the Denver Broncos
Dominique Moceanu – Olympic gymnast, member of the Magnificent Seven at the 1996 Olympic Games, the first American gymnastics team to win Olympic gold.
Brian Polian – college football coach
Chris Polian – American football scout and executive
Chuck Priefer – assistant coach, NFL
Greg Roman –  offensive coordinator, Baltimore Ravens
Don Shula – professional football player and Hall of Fame coach, Baltimore Colts and Miami Dolphins
Carl Taseff – professional football player and coach, Baltimore Colts, Buffalo Bills, and Miami Dolphins
Tom Telesco – general manager, Los Angeles Chargers
Dave Ziegler – General Manager, Las Vegas Raiders

Religion
Donald Edmond Pelotte – bishop, Diocese of Gallup, New Mexico
Anthony Edward Pevec – retired auxiliary bishop, Roman Catholic Diocese of Cleveland
Anthony Pilla – retired bishop, Roman Catholic Diocese of Cleveland

Academia
Leonard Calabrese – rheumatologist and internationally recognized researcher, Cleveland Clinic
James Danko – president, Butler University; former dean, Villanova University, Villanova School of Business
Paul A. Fleury – dean, Yale University School of Engineering
John Hardon – Jesuit priest, theologian, and intellectual
Robert L. Niehoff – Jesuit priest, President Emeritus of John Carroll University

Arts and entertainment
Eric Carmen – singer, musician
Brian P. Cleary – author of more than 25 children's books
Marcello Hernandez – comedian, new cast member on Saturday Night Live
Jack Riley –  comedic actor

Other
David Ferrie – alleged by New Orleans district attorney Jim Garrison to have been involved in assassination of John F. Kennedy

Faculty
George Bilgere – poet
Francesco Cesareo – president of Assumption College, former professor of history at John Carroll University
Vincent Dethier – insect physiologist and entomologist
Charles Geschke – co-founder of Adobe Systems Inc.
Sarah Willis – writer and novelist

References 

John Carroll University